Dao Bac is a professional poker player from Garden Grove, California. In 2007, Dao won a World Series of Poker bracelet in the $1,000 S.H.O.E. event. S.H.O.E. is a rotational event comprising Seven-Card Stud, Limit Hold'em, Omaha High-Low, and Stud Eight-or-better.

Dao was born in Vietnam and came to the United States in 1989.

As of 2008, Bac has tournament winnings of over $800,000.

World Series of Poker bracelets

References

External links
Dao Bac Hendon Mob results

American poker players
World Series of Poker bracelet winners
Vietnamese poker players
Vietnamese emigrants to the United States
Living people
Year of birth missing (living people)